The Path to 9/11 is a two-part miniseries that aired in the United States on ABC television on September 10–11, 2006 and in other countries. The film dramatizes the 1993 World Trade Center bombing in New York City and the events leading up to the September 11, 2001, terrorist attacks. The film was written by screenwriter Cyrus Nowrasteh, and directed by David L. Cunningham, and stars Harvey Keitel and Donnie Wahlberg.

The film was nominated for multiple Emmy Awards. It won the 2007 Emmy for Outstanding Single Camera Picture Editing.  It also won the 2007 Eddie Award for Best Edited Miniseries.

The film was controversial.  It aired once and as of September 11, 2021, it was no longer available.

Plot
The miniseries presented a dramatization of the sequence of events leading to the September 11 attacks in 2001 by Al-Qaeda on the United States, starting from the 1993 World Trade Center bombing and up to the minutes after its collapse in 2001. The movie takes the point of view of two main protagonists: John P. O'Neill, and a composite Central Intelligence Agency (CIA) agent, "Kirk".

O'Neill was the real-life Special Agent in charge of Al Qaeda investigations at the Federal Bureau of Investigation; he died in the collapse of the Twin Towers on September 11 shortly after retiring from the Federal Bureau of Investigation (FBI) and taking the position of Director of Security for the World Trade Center. The composite CIA agent "Kirk" is shown dealing with various American allies, especially Northern Alliance leader Ahmed Shah Massoud, in Afghanistan. In addition, "Patricia", a CIA headquarters analyst, represents the views of the rank and file at CIA headquarters.

The miniseries features dramatizations of various incidents summarized in the 9/11 Commission Report and represented in high-level discussions held in the Clinton and Bush administrations. The final hour of the movie dramatizes the events of 9/11, including a recreation of the second plane hitting the World Trade Center, Tom Burnett's calls to his wife, and John Miller's reporting near the scene of the attacks. The film concludes with information about the 9/11 Commission's recommendations, as well as the performance evaluation the Commission gave the government when it reconvened in 2005.

Production history
According to ABC, the movie is based on the "9/11 Commission Report and other sources", including interviews and news accounts. The first indication that ABC was running a miniseries appeared in a brief article in the New York Post. In it, the producers identified shooting locations and revealed that Harvey Keitel would play John O'Neill. At the time, ABC had a working name of Untitled Commission Report and the producers used the working title Untitled History Project, with the project beginning filming in July 2005 and scheduled to end post production by January 2006. Preview screenings were made in May for foreign broadcasters. The film was first publicly announced at the Television Critics Association summer press tour in July.

According to Advertising Age, the miniseries was a personal project of ABC entertainment president Steve McPherson, who began to look for a producer shortly after reading the 9/11 Commission Report.

The White House asked the major networks for airtime to present a Presidential Address to the nation. The interruption delayed the broadcast of the second half of Path to 9/11 by approximately 20 minutes in the Eastern and Central Time Zones. Otherwise, the movie aired without any interruption.

Filming was conducted in Morocco, New York City, Toronto, Hamilton, Ontario and Washington, D. C. The production was one of the few allowed to film at the headquarters of the Central Intelligence Agency in Langley, Virginia.

Controversy and criticisms

ABC received a range of criticism from terrorism experts and people portrayed in the film that The Path to 9/11 contained false scenes, distorted events and misrepresented actions of people. ABC received letters from Richard Clarke, Chief Executive Officer Bruce R. Lindsey of the William J. Clinton Foundation, and Douglas J. Band, Counselor to President Clinton, Samuel R. Berger, Madeleine Albright, John Beug, Democratic Representatives John Conyers Jr., John Dingell, Jane Harman, Louise Slaughter, and others. Before the miniseries aired, some screeners of The Path to 9/11 asserted that certain scenes misrepresented the real-life events upon which they were said to be based, and that some scenes were complete fabrications.

9/11 Commission members
Members of the 9/11 Commission criticized the accuracy of the film.
9/11 Commission Chairman Thomas Kean, the ranking Republican, served as both a consultant and as a co-executive producer. Shortly before the film's release, Kean said, "People in both parties didn't particularly like the commission report, and I think people in both parties aren't going to love this one". In response to one particular scene, Kean told an interviewer he "was all right with the made-up scene" where Clinton administration is accused of blocking a chance to kill bin Laden, saying "I don't think the facts are clear." Just weeks before the broadcast he "asked for changes that would address complaints raised by the former Clinton aides and that ABC is considering his request."

Commission member Richard Ben-Veniste said that the miniseries misrepresented facts presented in the 9/11 Commission report.

Advance viewing copies selectively distributed

The extensive pre-broadcast controversy over the film was based on content that was present in viewing copies sent to conservative political groups, talk show hosts and bloggers, including radio personalities such as Rush Limbaugh, and conservative movie critic Michael Medved. The office of former President Clinton repeatedly requested a preview copy, but was denied one, as was former Secretary of State Madeleine Albright. However, a version was shown at a Washington, DC screening to members and guests of the National Press Club, and to attendees of the Midwest Security and Police Conference in Chicago.

According to Jay Carson, a spokesman for Bill Clinton, Clinton's office requested a copy of the movie so that they could view it before it aired, but the request was denied. However, Limbaugh has at least partially disputed this, claiming that Ben-Veniste and others saw the film before him. Carson has also stated that Madeleine Albright and Sandy Berger had also requested a copy and had also not received them.

This prompted Albright and Berger to write letters  to ABC asking why they had not received copies and why ABC have chosen to run a movie whose accuracy is highly in question.

In addition to requesting an answer, Albright also stated the following reason for wanting a copy:

Criticisms of historical inaccuracy by FBI consultants

Two FBI agents refused advisory roles on the film, with one criticizing the film for creating a work of fiction and claiming it was inaccurate. Thomas E. Nicoletti had been hired by the filmmakers as a consultant, but quit because "There were so many inaccuracies...I'm well aware of what's dramatic license and what's historical inaccuracy," Nicoletti said. "And this had a lot of historical inaccuracy.'"

Dan Coleman, who retired from the FBI in 2004, said he also was concerned when he read the script in the summer of 2005 after being approached by producers about being a technical advisor. He described, "They sent me the script, and I read it and told them they had to be kidding," Coleman said. "I wanted my friends at the FBI to still speak to me." Coleman went on to say he did not want to be "haunted" by deceased colleagues who were falsely portrayed.

Alleged assassination opportunities not used by Clinton
Critics claim many inaccuracies in the film, including the depiction of the Clinton administration. For example in one scene, former National Security Advisor Sandy Berger is portrayed as unwilling to approve a plan to take out a surrounded Osama bin Laden. He leaves it to former CIA Director George Tenet to decide if he will take responsibility. In the original version of the film, Berger hangs up the phone on Tenet, and Tenet calls off the operation.

Nowrasteh has said that the abrupt hang-up portrayed was not in the script and was instead improvised. It was later removed from the version shown in the United States. When asked if he thought of the script as a "historical document," Nowrasteh has responded:

Anti-terrorism expert Richard Clarke said the film was "180 degrees from what happened" and made the following criticisms of the film:
Contrary to the movie, no US military or CIA personnel were in Afghanistan to have spotted bin Laden. When asked about this apparent discrepancy, Nowrasteh stated, "I've interviewed CIA agents who have told me otherwise. But that is the one concession we made. [In the original,] we had a CIA agent on the ground near bin Laden's compound—inside the wall even—and we took that out for the final presentation."
Contrary to the movie, the head of the Northern Alliance, Ahmad Shah Massoud, was nowhere near the alleged bin Laden camp and therefore could not have seen Osama bin Laden.
Contrary to the movie, Tenet actually said that he could not recommend a strike on the camp because the information was single sourced, and there would be no way to independently confirm bin Laden's presence in the target area by the time an already launched cruise missile would have reached it.

A member of the 9/11 Commission, Richard Ben-Veniste also stated that the scene depicting Berger hanging up the phone on Tenet is fictional.

Michael Scheuer, former head of the CIA Bin Laden Unit during the Clinton administration, a critic of President George W. Bush's Iraq policy, says it was not Berger who canceled assaults on bin Laden, but rather Clarke on Clinton's behalf. Scheuer states, "Mr. Clarke, of course, was at the center of Mr. Clinton's advisers, who resolutely refused to order the CIA to kill bin Laden. In spring 1998, I briefed Mr. Clarke and senior CIA, Department of Defense, and FBI officers on a plan to kidnap bin Laden. Mr. Clarke's reaction was that "it was just a thinly disguised attempt to assassinate bin Laden." I replied that if he wanted bin Laden dead, we could do the job quickly. Mr. Clarke's response was that the president did not want bin Laden assassinated, and that we had no authority to do so".

On May 13, 2012, the former Deputy Director of the Counter-Terrorism branch of the CIA, Hank Crumpton, relayed his experiences that verified both Scheumer and Path to 9/11's account regarding Clinton's failure to stop Bin Laden when he had the chance in a CBS 60 minutes interview. In it, he specifically cited that they had been led to a small village near Khandahar, saw evidence of Bin Laden's presence (security detail, a convoy, and Bin Laden himself exiting the vehicle) and immediately alerted the White House upon the optics being beamed towards to the CIA headquarters, but were ordered to stand down and abort the operation due to it taking several hours to arm and launch the TLAMs. He stated he requested that they give his exact location five to six hours from then, and the White House wasn't willing to allow the Afghan CIA agents to attack the compound directly.

Berger scene
Besides criticism of an inaccurate script, other fictional and inaccurate scenes were created by the cast. In the film, CIA agents who have infiltrated bin Laden's Afghan compound try to put an assassin named Kirk (Donnie Wahlberg) in contact with National Security Advisor Sandy Berger (Kevin Dunn); Berger, who was later convicted of illegally removing and destroying documents regarding the subject from the National Archives, is portrayed as "dithering" before hanging up on the agents. The scene was strongly contradicted by both Berger and the 9/11 Commission, including commission member Richard Ben-Veniste.

Former Secretary of State Albright questions her portrayal
Another scene in question supposedly portrays Madeleine Albright refusing to shoot missiles at Osama bin Laden without authority from Pakistan and eventually getting "permission" from them against the military's wishes. Albright insists that this is completely inaccurate. As Secretary of State, Albright had no involvement in military decisions.

Inaccuracies regarding airline travel
In the opening scene of the film, American Airlines is depicted as ignoring a security warning regarding hijacker Mohamed Atta. The airline involved was actually U.S. Airways (although the airline later merged with American Airlines in 2015).

According to the 9/11 Commission Report: "While Atta had been selected by CAPPS [a security warning at a U.S. Airway ticket counter] in Portland [Maine] three members of... [Atta's] hijacking team - Suqami, Wail al Shehri, and Waleed al Shehri - were selected [at an American Airline counter] in Boston. Their selection affected only the handling of their checked bags, not their screening at the checkpoint. All five men cleared the checkpoint and made their way to the gate for American 11." The incorrect depiction of location and airline may be justified as "time compression and compositing", as described in the film's disclaimer, or it may be an example of careless writing and sloppy fact-checking.

As a result of the inaccuracy, American Airlines stated they planned to pull all advertising from the ABC network and were considering legal action.

Clinton responds

Senate Democrats' letter to ABC
Senate Democratic Leader Harry Reid, Assistant Democratic Leader Dick Durbin, Senator Debbie Stabenow, Senator Charles Schumer, and Senator Byron Dorgan sent a letter to Robert A. Iger, the President and CEO of the Walt Disney Company. Their letter includes the following statement:

Scholastic Press announcement
Scholastic Press, which had a deal with ABC to distribute "educational materials" based on the movie, pulled the materials in question from their website on September 7, substituting them with materials focusing on "critical thinking and media literacy skills".

Dick Robinson, Chairman, President and CEO of Scholastic Press, had this to say on the matter:

Responses from cast and crew
Harvey Keitel, who plays John P. O'Neill—the lead role in the film, said he was told that the script was "history" project, but "it turned out not all the facts were correct" and by the time ABC tried to "heal the problem" it was "too late." In an interview two weeks before the film was to air he said more scenes needed to be corrected because "you cannot cross the line from a conflation of events to a distortion of the event." Keitel also said there was "discussion" and "argument" on-set during the filming about what was truthful and what was not, and that he disagreed with certain decisions.

Producer Marc Platt has acknowledged that the script was based in part on a book co-written by a Bush administration official. The book, The Cell: Inside the 9/11 Plot, and Why the FBI and CIA Failed to Stop It was co-written by John Miller, who serves as the assistant director of public affairs for the FBI.

Cyrus Nowrasteh, script writer for the film, said it was "an objective telling of the events of 9/11."

Response from Barbara Bodine
On September 8, former Ambassador to Yemen Barbara Bodine complained in a Los Angeles Times Op-Ed about her portrayal in the film: "According to the mythmakers, a battle ensued between a cop obsessed with tracking down Osama bin Laden and a bureaucrat more concerned with the feelings of the host government than the fate of Americans and the realities of terrorism. I know this is false. I was there. I was the ambassador." The ABC miniseries compressed Bodine's role to a single extended scene, suggesting she was dismissive, hostile, and vulgar toward FBI investigator John O'Neill from the moment of his October 2000 arrival in Yemen (see USS Cole bombing).

Television actress Patricia Heaton, who played Bodine and who has her own independent ABC development deal, did not comment on the controversy surrounding The Path to 9/11 nor its worldwide broadcast on September 10–11, 2006.

Errors and other criticism
In addition to the fictionalized scenes and misrepresentations, preview copies contained several smaller errors that prompted criticism that the film is sloppy in its fidelity to facts. For example, a caption in the film misspelled Madeleine Albright's name. Another example is a scene portraying a warning popping up on a computer when Mohamed Atta boarded American Airlines Flight 11 in Boston. The scene was factually inaccurate; Atta actually boarded a connecting U.S. Airways flight in Portland, Maine.

During production of the movie, there was a controversy in the Toronto media over the use of discarded medical charts and records as document props. The Information and Privacy Commissioner for the province of Ontario launched an investigation and the producers destroyed footage including the garbage and sent all remaining documents to a shredding service for disposal.

Republican William Bennett joined those saying there is "no reason to falsify the record" or "falsify conversations". During an appearance on CNN he called on ABC to correct the inaccuracies of the show and for fellow conservatives to join him in such a demand.

On December 22, 2006 Media Matters for America named ABC as "Misinformer" of 2006 for, among other things in The Path to 9/11, calling it:

a two-part miniseries that placed the blame for the September 11, 2001, terrorist attacks on the Clinton administration and whitewashed some of the Bush administration's failures leading up to the attacks.

Advertising discrepancies
While in the U.S. the film was marketed as a loose dramatization of events based on the 9/11 Commission Report, television advertising for the film in countries outside the U.S. called the film the "Official True Story". Further, an Australian TV listing called the film "the story of exactly what happened", which later changed to "The thrilling dramatised investigation" as the airing time drew near.

Allegation of non-profit involvement
Allegations of religious involvement surfaced in 2006, when journalist Max Blumenthal commented on David Loren Cunningham and his former links to the international mission organization Youth with a Mission. David is the son of Youth with a Mission founder Loren Cunningham. This connection to Youth with a Mission, and past allegations of a political agenda within the organization, were mentioned by Blumenthal. He also noted the previous intentions of David Cunningham to 'revolutionize' film and television by founding an auxiliary group within Youth With A Mission called TFI (The Film Institute). Youth With A Mission International Chairman Lynn Green acknowledged the allegations, yet rebutted these concerns, insisting that the organization, "had nothing to do with financing the film, nor did any YWAM personnel have any influence on the content of the film."

Support for The Path to 9/11

Responses from the right
Prior to its broadcast, conservative talk radio host Hugh Hewitt described as "a very accurate docudrama" and claimed the controversy by suggesting that what they call "the deep anger of the Clinton political machine" or the "narcissistic whining of the Clinton coterie" amounts to "self-serving complaints," to "an irrelevant diversion," to a "repellent" "hissy fit". Brent Bozell wrote, also before it was broadcast, that both "Clinton and Bush officials come under fire, and if it seems more anti-Clinton, that's only because they were in office a lot longer than Team Bush before 9-11. Indeed, the film drives home the point that from our enemies' perspective, it's irrelevant who is in the White House. They simply want to kill Americans and destroy America. The film doesn't play favorites, and the Bush administration takes its lumps as well." Hewitt added that the "program is not primarily about the Clinton stewardship—or lack thereof—of the national security. It is not even secondarily about that. Rather the mini-series is the first attempt — very successful — to convey to American television viewers what we are up against: The fanaticism, the maniacal evil, the energy and the genius for mayhem of the enemy."

To date, the miniseries has not been released on DVD. Writer and producer Cyrus Nowrasteh said that a stalled release is not due to lack of interest but rather political pressure, telling the Los Angeles Times in 2007 they were protecting Bill Clinton's presidential legacy and shielding Hillary Clinton from criticism for her 2008 presidential campaign. According to the LA Times, an ABC spokeswoman reached September 4, 2007, said that the company "has no release date at this time," and she declined to comment further.

Documentary revisits controversy
In August 2008, talk show host and documentary filmmaker John Ziegler and producer David Bossie of Citizens United premiered a documentary co-produced, written and directed by Ziegler entitled Blocking The Path to 9/11, which revisits the political controversy behind the ABC miniseries The Path to 9/11. Through interviews with the Path to 9/11 filmmakers and others, news clips regarding the controversy, and footage from the miniseries itself, the documentary argues not only that accusations of the filmmakers' covert political agenda were unfounded, but that they were generated by Clinton-era politicians concerned that the miniseries tarnished their political legacy, and were reported uncritically by bloggers and a biased news media. The documentary also asserts that Disney/ABC ultimately shelved plans to release a DVD of the miniseries as a result of pressure from the Democrats, specifically the Clintons themselves. As noted in the documentary, Disney/ABC denies this and claims the decision not to release a DVD was purely a business decision.

Jeffrey Ressner of The Politico, wrote Blocking 'The Path to 9/11 mirrored The Path to 9/11 because it "raises even more questions and adds its own set of disconnected dots to this broadcasting dilemma".

Awards
2007 Emmy Award: Outstanding Single Camera Picture Editing for a Miniseries or a Movie
2007 Emmy Award nominations: Outstanding Casting for a Miniseries, Movie or a Special; Outstanding Cinematography for a Miniseries or Movie; Outstanding Main Title Design; Outstanding Music Composition for a Miniseries, Movie or a Special (Original Dramatic Score); Outstanding Sound Editing for a Miniseries, Movie or a Special; Outstanding Special Visual Effects for a Miniseries, Movie or a Special;
 2007 American Cinema Editors Eddie Award: Best Edited Miniseries or Motion Picture for Commercial Television

Ratings in the United States

During the first night of the original broadcast in the United States, The Path to 9/11 was beaten by NBC's Sunday Night Football with 20.7 million watching the game, with Path tying a rerun of the film 9/11 shown on CBS with 13 million viewers. During its second night, The Path to 9/11 was again beat by an NFL doubleheader, this time the premiere of Monday Night Football on ESPN, with 10.5 million households watching those games, and The Path to 9/11 coming in second.

Cast
 Harvey Keitel as FBI Special Agent John P. O'Neill, Terrorism, and subsequently Head of Security at WTC
 Donnie Wahlberg as CIA Field Agent Kirk, Composite
 Mido Hamada as Ahmad Shah Massoud, Afghan Opposition Leader Against The Taliban
 Stephen Root as Richard Clarke
 Barclay Hope as John Miller
 Frank John Hughes as DSS Special Agent Bill Miller, Regional Security Officer U.S. Embassy Islamabad
 Patricia Heaton as Barbara Bodine, U.S. Ambassador to Yemen
 Shirley Douglas as U.S. Secretary of State Madeleine Albright
 Margaret Long as Secretary to The President
 Penny Johnson Jerald as U.S. National Security Advisor Condoleezza Rice {reprising her role from DC 9/11: Time of Crisis}
 Dan Lauria as George Tenet (Director of Central Intelligence)
 Amy Madigan as Patricia Carver, Composite CIA Headquarters Analyst
 Michael Murphy as William Cohen
 Trevor White as Scott Ramer
 William Sadler as Neil Herman
 Shaun Toub as Emad Salem
 Wendy Crewson as Valerie James
 Stephanie Moore as Deanna Burnett
 Michael Benyaer as Khalid Sheikh Mohammed
 Martin Brodie as Mohamed Atta, 9/11 leader piloted American Airlines Flight 11 after the hijacking
 Nayef Rashed as Ayman al-Zawahiri, Al-Qaeda Leader
 Fulvio Cecere as Joe Dunne
 Marie V. Cruz as Aida Fariscal
 David Zayas as Lou Napoli
 David Huband as Charley
 Kevin Dunn as U.S. National Security Advisor Sandy Berger
 Nabil Elouahabi as Ramzi Yousef, World Trade Center Bomber
 Enis Esmer as Mohammed Salameh
 Moe Fawaz as Majed Moqed
 Akin Gazi as Mohamed Rashed Daoud Al-Owhali
 Youssef Kerkour as Mahmud Abouhalima
 Sam Lupovich as Khalid al-Mihdhar
 David Michie as Nicholas Lanier, Composite ABC Middle East correspondent
 Hani Noureldin as Nawaf al-Hazmi
 Armando Riesco as John Atkinson
 Neil Crone as Dorsey
 George R. Robertson as Vice President Dick Cheney
 Al Sapienza as Donald Sadowy
 Katy Selverstone as Nancy Floyd
 Jean Yoon as Betty Ong, Flight Attendant
 Azdin Zaman as Abdulaziz al-Omari
 Gabe Fazio as J. P. O'Neill, son of John O'Neill
 Nicky Guadagni as Mary Jo White
 Riz Ahmed as Yosri
 Moody el-Karaouni as Waleed al-Shehri
 Tareef Marrel as Wail al-Shehri
 Noam Jenkins as Marwan al-Shehhi
 Tarik Ben Ali as Ziad Jarrah

Broadcasting

United States
Part 1: September 10, 2006, at 8:00 pm–10:45 pm (shortened from 11 pm) at EDT on ABC
Part 2: September 11, 2006, at 8:00 pm–9:00 pm at EDT on ABC
Part 2 (continued): September 11, 2006, at 9:20 pm – 10:17 pm at EDT on ABC (After President Bush National Address) (See exception)

ABC's broadcasts though originally planned to be shown "with limited commercial interruption" were aired with no commercials, since the network was unable to obtain sponsorship. The broadcasts were also watched in Canada, where the network is available on cable and satellite as well as over-the-air in most border areas.

Part 2 of the miniseries, also uninterrupted, aired in the San Diego, California market on KGTV nearly a week later, on September 16, 2006, from 8:30pm–10:30 pm.

Australia
Part 1: September 10, 2006, at 8:30 pm on Channel Seven
Part 2: September 11, 2006, at 9:30 pm on Channel Seven

Belgium
Part 1: September 13, 2006, at 9:05 pm on VT4
Part 2: September 20, 2006, at 9:05 pm on VT4
Part 1: August 20, 2008, at 9:10 pm on RTL-TVI
Part 2: August 20, 2008, at 10:00 pm on RTL-TVI
Part 3: August 20, 2008, at 10:50 pm on RTL-TVI

Croatia
Part 1: March 6, 2010, at 23:15 pm on Nova TV
Part 2: March 13, 2010, at 23:15 pm on Nova TV

Finland
Part 1: November 11, 2007, on MTV3
Part 2: November 18, 2007, on MTV3
Part 3: November 25, 2007, on MTV3
Part 4: December 2, 2007, on MTV3
Part 5: December 9, 2007, on MTV3

In Finland the miniseries was shown in five parts as distinct from normal two.

India
Part 1: September 10, 2006, at 9:00 pm on Zee Studio
Part 2: September 11, 2006, at 9:00 pm on Zee Studio

Italy
Part 1 & 2: March 13, 2007, on Sky

Japan
Part 1 & 2: January 14, 2007, at 8:00 pm on Wowow
Synopsis: September 13, 2009, from 9:00 pm – 10:54 pm on TV Asahi

New Zealand
Part 1: September 10, 2006, at 7:30 pm on TV One
Part 2: September 11, 2006, at 7:30 pm on TV One

Norway
Part 1: January 3, 2008, on TVNorge
Part 2: January 4, 2008, on TVNorge
Part 1: September 12, 2008, on TVNorge

South Africa
Part 1: September 11, 2007, on M-Net
Part 2: September 11, 2007, on M-Net

Spain
Part 1: September 12, 2007, at 10.00 pm on Antena 3
Part 2: September 12, 2007, at 12:00 pm on Antena 3

United Kingdom
Part 1: September 10, 2006, at 8:00 pm on BBC2
Part 2: September 11, 2006, at 8:30 pm on BBC2

BBC2's broadcasts were also watched in Ireland, Belgium and the Netherlands, where the channel is available on cable.

See also
9/11 Commission Report
I Missed Flight 93
Inside 9/11
Special Bulletin
The Day After
The Reagans

References

External links

9/11 Commission Report
Blocking "The Path to 9/11" 

American Broadcasting Company original programming
2000s American television miniseries
Films based on the September 11 attacks
Films shot in Hamilton, Ontario
Films shot in Toronto
Films set in Washington, D.C.
Films set in Islamabad
Films set in Manila
Films set in Afghanistan
Films set in Nairobi
Films set in Washington (state)
Films set in Aden
Films set in Madrid
Films set in 1993
Films set in 1994
Films set in 1995
Films set in 1996
Films set in 1997
Films set in 1998
Films set in 1999
Films set in 2000
Films based on non-fiction books
Self-censorship